Ricardo Manuel may refer to

People
Ricardo Manuel Ferreira Sousa
Ricardo Manuel da Silva Fernandes
Ricardo Manuel Cardoso Martins
Ricardo Manuel Andrade e Silva Sá Pinto
Ricardo Manuel Ciciliano Bustillo

Ships
, a Panamanian coaster in service 1963-71